Georgia's 5th Senate District elects one member of the Georgia Senate. Its current representative for 2019–20  is Democrat Sheikh Rahman.

References

External links 

Georgia Senate districts
Gwinnett County, Georgia